All India Law Students Association (AILSA or अखिल भारतीय विधि छात्र संघ) is a non-profit association of students and lawyers who are dedicated to the promotion of welfare of law students all over India. AILSA provides students with opportunities to interact with legal professionals in an international arena. The organisation's activities include academic conferences, publications, the global coordination of student organisations, seminars, providing free legal aid. etc. In the past the association has organised a National Legal Essay Competition under the leadership of Mr. Manas Dowlani.

Presidents
Presidents of the Association are selected by the AILSA Executive Council. Recently, the Executive Council passed a unanimous resolution selecting Ms. Deepishika Goyal as the President.

[*Incumbent]

Patron
Dr. Adish Aggarwala, President, International Council of Jurists; Chairman, All India Bar Association; Special Counsel, Government of India; Ex. Vice - Chairman, Bar Council of India is the patron of the organisation. Mr. Suresh Sharma, Lawyer & former legal consultant to ministry of Home Affairs and former President of All India Law Students' Association was nominated as permanent Advisor to the Association.

References

2008 establishments in Delhi
Student societies in India
Legal education in India
Organizations established in 2008